Henderson is a city and the county seat of Rusk County, Texas, in Northeast Texas. Its population was 13,271 at the 2020 census. Henderson is named for James Pinckney Henderson, the first governor of Texas.

The city has functioned as a major crossroads in Northeast Texas over the last two centuries. Several major highways pass through the business district of the town, including U.S. Route 259, Texas State Highway 64, U.S. Route 79, Texas State Highway 43, Texas State Highway 42, and Texas State Highway 64.

Annual events in the city of Henderson include the Heritage Syrup Festival in November, celebrating the East Texas tradition of syrup making, and the East Texas Sacred Harp Convention in August featuring shape note music.

The city has a vibrant downtown historic district, with many buildings dating to before the American Civil War. The city has 19 historical markers, including homes dating from the 1880s, churches, and colleges. Downtown Henderson is one of the most dramatic and charming downtowns in the East Texas area. Colorful, canvas awnings highlight the ornate buildings that house Henderson's downtown merchants, and offer shade to downtown shoppers visiting the various antiques stores, clothing stores, and restaurants lining the main streets.

History

The city of Henderson was established by European Americans before the State of Texas was founded. It was developed on land donated by W.B. Ochiltree and James Smith; it became the county seat of Rusk County when an act of legislature created Rusk County on January 16, 1843. The First Methodist and First Baptist churches were established in 1842 and 1845, respectively. The first courthouse, made of wood, was completed in 1849. After the Civil War, the International and Great Northern Railroad crossed through Rusk County, but bypassed Henderson. In 1869, A white mob lynched five Black men, including two preachers, in the public square outside the courthouse without trial. In 1874, the Henderson and Overton Branch Railroad Company built a stretch of railroad connecting Henderson to the tracks running through Overton. This stretch of railroad was later sold to the Missouri Pacific Railroad (now Union Pacific) and remains in use to this day.

In 1878, a fire destroyed the courthouse, and a brick courthouse was built in its place. This encouraged the construction of several other brick buildings, including the Howard Dickinson House, now a historical site.

In 1930, C. M. "Dad" Joiner brought in the Daisy Bradford #3 Discovery Well 6 miles northwest of Henderson.  The discovery of oil in October 1930 created a booming economy in the area, with the population of Henderson increasing from 2,000 to over 10,000 in a few months. The oil fields in and surrounding Henderson, part of the high-producing five-county East Texas Oil Field, continue to provide a large part of the wealth of the town, county, and region.

During World War II, airmen cadets from the Royal Air Force, flying from their training base at Terrell, Texas, routinely flew to Henderson on training flights. The community served as a stand-in for the British for Dunkirk, France, which is the same distance from London, England as Henderson is from Terrell.

1860 Henderson fire 
On August 5, 1860, a fire broke out and burned most of the booming town of Henderson. Forty-three buildings, including two hotels, were destroyed in the fire, for a loss of $220,000.

According to the Depot Museum, a man named John Crow recalled the fire as follows:

I was about eight years old when Henderson burned. I went to town with my father the day after the fire. It burned every house as well as I recollect, except the Flanagan Brick Building. I remember I was barefooted and careful not to burn my feet. My father said at the time they thought a fellow named Green Herndon, a union man, had hired a negro woman to burn Henderson. Herndon was a northerner and was a pronounced opponent of secession. On the negro woman's testimony, a mob gathered, threw a loop around his neck, tied it to a saddle horse, which went around the public square dragging Herndon to death. Then they hung the body to a tree and shot it full of holes ... War was in preparation and people were in fits of anger. When the war broke out, the men got all the files they could find and went to the blacksmith shops and made knives and swords. There was much laughter and I remember they said, "We'll whip those damn Yankees with axes and butcher knives. Everyone was anxious to go."John Crow was John Stephen Crow, born in Henderson, TX on 5 Mar 1852 and died there on 19 Oct 1952. He is buried at Maple Grove Cemetery. His father, Moses Melton Crow, was part of a large group of family, friends and neighbors who left the area of Henry and Clayton Co, GA and were early settlers in Rusk Co. The surnames of these early settlers include Burks, Cates, Crow, Mitchell and others.

2015 Henderson Tornado 

On Memorial Day, May 25, 2015, an EF-2 rated tornado struck Henderson. That day, multiple tornadoes had struck other areas in Texas, Arkansas, and Oklahoma. The tornado uprooted trees, damaged buildings, and caused minor damage to areas such as downtown, but no severe damage was recorded.

Geography
Henderson is located at  (32.153938, −94.802732).

Transportation

Airports
The Rusk County Airport is a county-owned, public-use airport located 3 miles west of downtown Henderson.

Major highways
 State Highway 64
 State Highway 42
 State Highway 43
 Highway 259
 Highway 79

Demographics

As of the 2020 United States census, there were 13,271 people, 3,968 households, and 2,752 families residing in the city.

As of the census of 2000,  11,273 people, 4,350 households, and 2,971 families were residing in the city. The population density was 947.6 people/sq mi (365.8/km2). The 4,831 housing units averaged 406.1/sq mi (156.7/km2). The racial makeup of the city was 68.98% White, 22.34% African American, 0.27% Native American, 0.47% Asian, 6.81% from other races, and 1.13% from two or more races. Hispanics or Latinos of any race were 11.80% of the population.

Of the 4,350 households,  32.6% had children under 18 living with them, 51.3% were married couples living together, 13.7% had a female householder with no husband present, and 31.7% were not families. About 28.9% of all households were made up of individuals, and 17.1% had someone living alone who was 65 years of age or older. The average household size was 2.52, and the average family size was 3.12.

In the city, the age distribution was 26.9% under the age of 18, 8.9% from 18 to 24, 25.9% from 25 to 44, 19.5% from 45 to 64, and 18.8% who were 65 or older. The median age was 37 years. For every 100 females, there were 87.3 males. For every 100 females age 18 and over, there were 81.2 males.

The median income for a household in the city was $31,766, and for a family was $38,095. Males had a median income of $31,285 versus $19,473 for females. The per capita income for the city was $19,491.

Government

Local government
The structure of the management and coordination of city services is:

State government
Henderson is represented in the Texas Senate by Republican Bryan Hughes, District 1, and in the Texas House of Representatives by Republican Travis Clardy, District 11.

The Texas Department of Criminal Justice contracts for the operation of East Texas Multi-Use Facility in Henderson, housing over 2000 male and female state inmates in treatment programs.  The facility is operated by the Management and Training Corporation.

Federal government
At the federal level, the two U.S. Senators from Texas are Republicans John Cornyn and Ted Cruz; Henderson is part of Texas' US Congressional 1st District, which is currently represented by Republican Louie Gohmert.

Education

Primary and secondary schools

Public schools
The Henderson Independent School District includes five campuses, Wylie Primary School, Wylie Elementary School, Northside Intermediate School, Henderson Middle School, and Henderson High School. The school mascot of Henderson is a lion, and the school colors are red and blue. School sports are an important part of Henderson's culture. A 3-A school, the Henderson Lions football team beat Chapel Hill, Texas, to become state champions in 2010. Many students are members of one or more athletic organizations.

A very small portion of the City of Henderson falls within the West Rusk ISD.

Private schools
The City of Henderson is also served by Full Armor Christian Academy, a nondenominational private school.

Colleges

Henderson is the home of the Texas Baptist Institute and Seminary, a Missionary Baptist institution of the American Baptist Association.

Media
Currently, seven media outlets and one newspaper are located in Henderson, as well as many more in the surrounding areas.

Newspaper
The Henderson Daily News

Radio

AM stations

FM stations

Culture
Parks and recreation
Henderson has 6 parks covering 118 acres. The parks are Fair Park, Lake Forest Park, Misner Park, Montgomery Park, Smith Park, and Yates Park.

Lake Forest Park covers 60 acres and is the largest park in Henderson. It features a 15-acre lake, three fishing piers, a disc golf course, gardens, lighted pavilions, playgrounds, the Henderson Civic Center, and a plaza for concerts and events.

Fair Park covers 40 acres and features 1.8 miles of walking trails, a skate park, a baseball field, tennis courts, playgrounds, a splash pad, and a pavilion.

Libraries and museums
The Depot Museum sits on 5 acres, and features a museum, a children's discovery center, plus several historic buildings and structures, including a railroad depot, a dry good store, a caboose, and a cotton gin.

The Rusk County Library is located in a historic building at 106 East Main Street in downtown Henderson.

Attractions
The Henderson Civic Theater is a community theater that puts on live stage performances. It is located in historic downtown Henderson in the old Opera House building.

The Veteran's Memorial is located at the Rusk County Courthouse and honors veterans from Rusk County.

The Howard-Dickinson House is a Texas Historic Landmark that was built in 1855 and offers tours.

Notable people

 Archie Bell, lead singer for Archie Bell & the Drells
 Drew Coleman, former cornerback for New York Jets, Jacksonville Jaguars, Detroit Lions
 Joe Delaney, late running back for the Kansas City Chiefs
 Rickey Dudley, former tight end for the Oakland Raiders, Cleveland Browns, and Tampa Bay Buccaneers Super Bowl Champion 
 Sandy Duncan, singer, actress, comedian
 Ricky Lynn Gregg, singer
 Bror Julius Olsson Nordfeldt, a Swedish painter, died in Henderson in 1955 at age 77.
 Paul Sadler, Henderson attorney, former state representative
 General James Smith, general in Texas Revolution, served in first Texas legislature, buried in Smith Park in Henderson and neighboring Smith County is named for him
 Mark White, former governor of Texas
 Harry Whittington, lawyer
 Trestan Ebner, Running back for the Chicago Bears

In popular culture
The 1970 science-fiction film, Colossus: The Forbin Project, mentions Henderson as the site of the fictitious Henderson Air Force Base, the target of a retaliatory ICBM fired by Colossus' Soviet counterpart, the defense supercomputer "Guardian".

Climate
The climate in this area is characterized by hot, humid summers and generally mild to cool winters.  According to the Köppen climate classification, Henderson has a humid subtropical climate, Cfa'' on climate maps.

References

External links
City of Henderson official website
Henderson Area Chamber of Commerce website
Henderson ISD official website

Cities in Texas
Cities in Rusk County, Texas
County seats in Texas
Longview metropolitan area, Texas